The Côte de Saint-Nicolas is a climb of Wallonia in the municipality of Saint-Nicolas in Belgium. It is often included in the Liège–Bastogne–Liège cycling classic, where it comes as one of the last difficulties, at approximately 6 km from the finish in the neighbouring municipality of Ans. With a length of 1.4 km at an average gradient of 7.6%, it is often a decisive site of the race.

The climb is nicknamed The Italian Hill, because of the composition of its immigrant population and their descendants – often from Sicily and the South of Italy. Their presence is particularly expressed by the many Italian flags hanging outside the windows, especially during race day of Liège–Bastogne–Liège.

References

Liège–Bastogne–Liège
Climbs in cycle racing in Belgium
Mountains and hills of the Ardennes (Belgium)
Mountains and hills of Liège Province
Liège